The International Conference on Missions (ICOM)  is a non-denominational, non-profit, Christian organization that organizes an annual conference on missions for the Unaffiliated Christian Church/Church of Christ congregations around the world. It was originally known as the National Missionary Convention (1954-2011).

Future conferences
ICOM 2019: November 15–18, 2019 – Kansas City, MO
ICOM 2020: Indianapolis, IN
ICOM 2021: Richmond, VA

References

Non-profit organizations based in Indiana
Restoration Movement
Christian missions